The 2010 Adelaide Thunderbirds season saw Adelaide Thunderbirds compete in the 2010 ANZ Championship. After winning nine games, Thunderbirds finished second, behind New South Wales Swifts, during the regular season. However, after defeating Swifts in the major semi-final, Thunderbirds defeated Waikato Bay of Plenty Magic 52–42 in the grand final to win their third premiership. The 2010 season was the last season that Thunderbirds played in black, white, teal and silver, the colours of their sponsors, Port Adelaide Football Club. Ahead of the 2011 season, Thunderbirds announced they were changing their team colours to pink.

Players

Player movements

2010 roster

Notes
  Edwina Gosse, Jasmine Keene, Melissa Rowland, Beth Shimmin and Sheree Wingard were all members of the 2010 Southern Force squad.
  Kate Shimmin was also in the 2010 Australian Institute of Sport squad.

Regular season
After winning nine games, Thunderbirds finished second, behind New South Wales Swifts, during the regular season. One of the highlights of Thunderbirds' season came in the Round 5 away match against Central Pulse when they achieved a 35-goal winning margin, a club and league record win. Carla Borrego also equalled Romelda Aiken's record for most goals scored in an ANZ Championship match.

Fixtures and results
Round 1

Round 2

Round 3

Round 4

Round 5

Round 6

Round 7
Adelaide Thunderbirds received a bye.
Round 8

Round 9

Round 10

Round 11

Round 12

Round 13

Round 14

Final table

Playoffs

Major semi-final

Grand final

Gallery

Award winners

Thunderbirds awards

ANZ Championship awards

Australian Netball Awards

References

Adelaide Thunderbirds seasons
Adelaide Thunderbirds